Evert William Vanthoff (1 January 1909 – 7 June 1992) was an Australian rules footballer who played with Melbourne in the Victorian Football League (VFL).

Vanthoff was a small forward, who could also play as a rover. In the 1930 VFL season, his first, he kicked four goals in a win over Footscray, which would remain a career best. He represented the VFL in the 1933 Sydney Carnival, against South Australia.

He served with the Royal Australian Air Force in World War II.

During the 27 years he worked at the Melbourne Cricket Ground, he held various positions. He spent 10 years as assistant curator to Bert Lutrell and then was the head curator himself for six years in the 1950s. In 1956 he left to become a groundsman at Trinity Grammar School.

References

1909 births
Australian rules footballers from Victoria (Australia)
Melbourne Football Club players
Terang Football Club players
Cricket curators
Royal Australian Air Force personnel of World War II
1992 deaths
Royal Australian Air Force airmen
Military personnel from Victoria (Australia)